Roland Institute Of Technology, SURYA VIHAR, Berhampur, Odisha, India, also known as RIT,  was established in 2000, to impart degree courses in engineering under the Roland Educational & Charitable Trust. The prime objective of the Trust has been the promotion of facilities of technical education for people of South Odisha and around. It is ISO 9001:2000 certification and affiliated to Biju Patnaik University of Technology (BPUT).

Admission
Admission to different courses (B.Tech/MCA) of the university (BPUT) shall be based on criteria decided by the Academic Council of the university (BPUT). IT is done on the basis of rank secured in the Odisha Joint Entrance Examination(Odisha-JEE) for engg. There shall be provision for direct admission for a limited number of NRI/FN students. Details of criteria shall be as per provisions in the rule formulated for the purpose. The university (BPUT) shall adopt the eligibility criteria as specified by AICTE/ UGC.

Courses offered
Recently, the MCA branch has been reopened in the college, after it was closed in 2003 for some controversy. The college offers specialization in

B.Tech
The institute offers following courses for B.TECH:

MCA
The institute also offers MCOCA course:

Departments

Computer Science & Engineering
Department Of Computer Science had been established in the Year 2001. Four computer labs are there with more than 250 Pc's.

Laboratories
Operating Systems Lab
Programming Lab-I
Programming Lab-II
Internet Lab
Networking Lab./ Architecture Lab
MCA Lab

Electronics & Telecommunication Engineering
Department Of Electronics & telecommunication had been established in the Year 2001.

Laboratories
Basic electronics lab
Analog Electronics Lab
DSP Lab
VLSI Lab
Design & Simulation lab

Electrical & Electronics Engineering
Department Of Electrical & Electronics had been established in the Year 2001.

Laboratories
Basic electrical lab
Machine Lab
Design & Simulation lab
The department has laboratories and classrooms for learning and research.

Civil Engineering

Laboratories
The department has laboratories and classrooms for learning and development for student.

MCA
It was re-introduced in 2007.

Placement
The Training and Placement Department is a department through which arrangements are made with organizations to hold campus interviews and industrial training for the students. The students are sent by the department for industrial training so that the students gain a first hand knowledge of working in industries.
The college hosts a number of on and off-campuses every year. The recent companies in which the students participated are Satyam, L & T Infotech, LionBridge, Subex, Infosys, I-flex, Zen technologies and many more....
Overall for the 2009 batch, 36 students were placed in above companies and 71 students were placed at HUGHES consultancy.

Facilities

Central Library
The focal point of the institute is its Central Library. Presently it is equipped with 20,566 Volumes of 3,510 titles of books and 1152 no's Journals & magazines of national and international Publications.

Others
Conference Hall
All Labs, HODs, In-Charges, administrative sections and Library are connected by intercom.
Number of Labs are 18 with a gross area of 2752.32 Sq. m.
Drawing Hall. of 178.46 Sq.m. is existing.
Besides different computer Labs one Computer center with a gross area of 186.73 Sq. m is available.
Workshop of 994.33Sq.m area is functioning.
Exam Hall / Instructional Resource center of 281.94 Sqm is available.
New Auditorium / Conference Hall of approx. 800sq.m area is under construction
The institute has a seminar hall for conducting pre-placement training and workshops.
Three auditoriums each of 300 seating capacity exist for departmental uses and technical seminars.
Fully Automated Central Library with Digitalized and Standard Library Scheme Installed

References

External links
 Roland Institute of Technology

Private engineering colleges in India
Engineering colleges in Odisha
Colleges affiliated with Biju Patnaik University of Technology
Education in Berhampur
Educational institutions established in 2000
2000 establishments in Orissa